The putative American Elm cultivar Ulmus americana 'College' was raised at the Wedge Nursery (ceased trading 2008), Albert Lea, Minnesota, and was first listed in its catalogue of 1961. However, the tree has never been formally recognized as a valid cultivar.

Description
Not available.

Cultivation
'College' is not known to remain in cultivation.

Synonymy
'Elm College': Wedge Nursery, Minnesota, name in synonymy.

References

American elm cultivar
Ulmus articles missing images
Ulmus